Angustibacter aerolatus is a Gram-positive and aerobic bacterium from the genus of Angustibacter which has been isolated from air from the Jeju island in Korea.

References

External links
Type strain of Angustibacter aerolatus at BacDive -  the Bacterial Diversity Metadatabase

Bacteria described in 2013
Actinomycetia